"Stone" is a song by American rock band Alice in Chains and the second single from their fifth studio album, The Devil Put Dinosaurs Here (2013). The song was released as a single on March 25, 2013, reached No. 1 on Billboard's Mainstream Rock chart, and stayed on the chart for 20 weeks. A music video directed by Robert Schober was released for the song. The song was first played live on April 10, 2013, during Alice in Chains' appearance on Jimmy Kimmel Live in Los Angeles. The lyrics to "Stone" are printed on the bottom plate of a limited edition of Jerry Cantrell's signature Dunlop Cry Baby Wah pedal released in 2013. 

The riff to "Stone" - that Cantrell hummed into his phone while recovering from a shoulder surgery - was ranked No. 16 on Guitar World's 2019 list of the 20 best guitar riffs of the decade.

Origin and recording
Singer-guitarist Jerry Cantrell came up with the song's riff whilst recovering from surgery to repair his damaged shoulder cartilage in 2011. He told Ultimate-Guitar.com: "My arm was f--ked up and I couldn't play guitar so I just hummed that riff into a phone and that's how that song came to be. When I could play a little bit and we were going through riffs, I remember doing some riffs with Paul Figueroa, our engineer. I'm like, 'Wait a minute, I got a good one, man. Check this out.' I started f--kin' playing it to him and it was me singing into the f--kin' phone. I'm like, 'Dude, this riff is killer. Give me a guitar and I'll f--kin' work it out.' So that song I actually came up with just off a voice message on a phone. I didn't even have a guitar; I just f--kin' hummed it into the phone."

Cantrell showed the original voice mail of him humming Stone's riff into his phone during an interview with Team Rock Radio in 2014.

The brooding song includes the lyric: "What makes you want to carve your initials in me?... Find me distant, outwardly rough obscene." Singer William DuVall explained to The Los Angeles Times: "It seems to be about confronting outside misperceptions. You think you know me? You don't."

Release and reception
"Stone" was released to radio stations on March 25, 2013.

According to Graham Hartmann writing for Loudwire, "the new single [...] has its fair share of sludge [...], further delving into a dark and unnerving side of alternative rock and atmospheric metal."

In 2019, the riff to "Stone" was ranked No. 16 on Guitar World's list of the 20 best guitar riffs of the decade.

Music video
A lyric video for "Stone" was released on YouTube on April 15, 2013. The music video for "Stone" was shot in Lucerne Valley, California and directed by Robert Schober (aka Roboshobo), who directed their previous music video, "Hollow". The video features the band playing on a rocky hill. Separately, three individuals are alone trying to transport stones that get heavier or larger, using a basket, a cart, and one rolling a boulder uphill. Once they are unable to proceed, they stop and become stones.

Personnel
Jerry Cantrell – lead vocals, lead guitar
William DuVall – backing vocals, rhythm guitar
Sean Kinney – drums
Mike Inez – bass

Charts

Weekly charts

Year-end charts

References

External links

Stone on Setlist.fm

2013 singles
Alice in Chains songs
Songs written by Jerry Cantrell
Song recordings produced by Nick Raskulinecz
Sludge metal songs